The Hero is an American television sitcom that aired on NBC on Thursday nights at 9:30 p.m. Eastern from September 8, 1966 to January 5, 1967. It was the first television series for Richard Mulligan.

Premise
The series centers on Sam Garrett, the star of a fictional Western television series titled Jed Clayton, U.S. Marshal.

Cast
Richard Mulligan as Sam Garret
Mariette Hartley as Ruth Garret
Bobby Horan as Paul Garret
Victor French as Fred Gilman
Marc London as Dewey

Episodes

References

1966 American television series debuts
1967 American television series endings
NBC original programming
English-language television shows
1960s American sitcoms
Television series by Warner Bros. Television Studios
Television series by CBS Studios